Superhero Movie is a 2008 American superhero parody film written and directed by Craig Mazin, produced by Robert K. Weiss and David Zucker, and starring Drake Bell, Sara Paxton, Christopher McDonald, and Leslie Nielsen. It was originally titled Superhero! as a nod to one of the Zuckers's previous films, Airplane!, in which Nielsen also starred.

A spoof of the superhero film genre, primarily Sam Raimi's Spider-Man and Christopher Nolan's Batman Begins, as well as other modern-day comic book film adaptations, the film follows in the footsteps of the Scary Movie series of comedies, with which the film's poster shares a resemblance. It was also inspired by, and contains homages to some of Zucker, Abrahams and Zucker's earlier spoof films such as Airplane! and The Naked Gun.

Production began on September 17, 2007, in Los Angeles. It was released on March 28, 2008, in the United States to generally negative reviews from critics (but more positive than earlier entries such as Date Movie and Meet the Spartans), but received a moderate box office success, grossing over $71 million worldwide on a $35 million budget.

Plot 
Rick Riker (Drake Bell) is an unpopular student at Empire High School. He lives with his Uncle Albert (Leslie Nielsen) and Aunt Lucille (Marion Ross), and his best friend, Trey (Kevin Hart), who is also his confidante. Rick has a crush on Jill Johnson (Sara Paxton), but she is dating bully Lance Landers (Ryan Hansen). One day, Rick and his class go on a school field trip at an animal research lab run by terminally ill businessman Lou Landers (Christopher McDonald), who is Lance's uncle. During the trip, Rick accidentally saturates himself in animal-attraction liquid, which causes a group of animals to hump him. This also leads a chemically enhanced radioactive dragonfly to fly onto Rick's neck and bite him.

Meanwhile, Lou creates a machine designed to heal illness; testing it on himself, he gains perfect health at the cost of needing to drain life energy from a victim per day. To avoid arrest for murder, Lou becomes the villain Hourglass. During a science fair, Rick begins to experience strange physical traits which creates a number of mishaps, and later realizes that he has developed superpowers from the dragonfly bite. Rick reveals his secret to his uncle and Trey, and an argument starts between him and Albert. The next day, while visiting the bank with Lucille, Rick accidentally allows a bank robber to make off with stolen cash. The robber then shoots and injures Albert.

Rick is later met by Xavier (Tracy Morgan) who takes Rick to his school for mutants, where he meets Storm, Wolverine, Cyclops, Invisible Woman, Barry Bonds and Mrs. Xavier, who convince Rick to become a superhero. At home, Rick creates a superhero costume and dubs himself The Dragonfly. As Dragonfly, Rick starts watching over the city and fighting crime, quickly becoming a media sensation, despite being unable to fly. Later, Dragonfly attempts to stop Hourglass from robbing a warehouse full of "ceryllium" as part of his evil plan but fails, allowing Hourglass to escape.

Later that night, Jill is attacked by thieves, but Dragonfly saves her and they share a kiss. Meanwhile, Landers plans to construct a machine that will kill people and give him enough life energy to make him immortal. Later that night, Landers and Lance have dinner with Rick's family and Jill, but Landers secretly learns of Rick's true identity when he notices the same injuries on Rick as on Dragonfly. Making up an awkward excuse, he and Lance leave. Landers returns minutes later as Hourglass and kills Aunt Lucille. Albert awakens from his coma, learning about her death indirectly from his moronic doctor. After a comic funeral, Jill meets Rick and offers to begin a relationship with him. However, Rick fears Hourglass will come for Jill if they were together, and therefore rejects Jill, leaving her hurt and furious.

Rick decides to end his superhero career, but knowing that Hourglass would head to an awards ceremony to kill hundreds of people, he gets Albert to take him there. At the ceremony, Rick is tricked by Landers into mistaking the Dalai Lama for Hourglass, and chaos ensues. Meanwhile, Jill discovers that Landers is Hourglass. When Hourglass clashes with Dragonfly on a rooftop, he tries to activate his machine, but Dragonfly manages to kill him with a bomb that had been comically stuck onto his genitals after being thrown by Hourglass, and finally avenging Aunt Lucille's death. Jill is thrown off the side of the building by the explosion, but Dragonfly manages to grow wings and save her. Jill learns that Rick is Dragonfly due to a family ring he wears being exposed through a hole in his glove and the two begin a relationship. After being thanked for saving the city, Rick flies away with Jill, but the two are unexpectedly rammed by a passing helicopter.

Cast 
 Drake Bell as Rick Riker / Dragonfly
 Sam Cohen as Young Rick Riker
 Sara Paxton as Jill Johnson
 Christopher McDonald as Lou Landers / Hourglass
 Leslie Nielsen as Albert Riker
 Kevin Hart as Trey
 Marion Ross as Lucille Riker
 Ryan Hansen as Lance Landers
 Robert Joy as Stephen Hawking
 Brent Spiner as  Dr. Strom
Jeffrey Tambor as Dr. Whitby
 Tracy Morgan as Professor Xavier
 Regina Hall as Mrs. Xavier
 Pamela Anderson as The Invisible Girl
 Simon Rex as Human Torch
 Craig Bierko as Wolverine (scenes cut, credit only)
 Richard Tillman as Wolverine
 Robert Hays as Blaine Riker
 Nicole Sullivan as Julia Riker
 Dan Castellaneta as Carlson
 Keith David as Chief Karlin
 Marisa Lauren as Storm
 Miles Fisher as Tom Cruise
 Charlene Tilton as Mrs. Johnson
 Sean Simms as Barry Bonds
 Freddie Pierce as Tony Bennett
 Howard Mungo as Nelson Mandela
 Lil' Kim as Xavier's daughter
 Cameron Ali Sims as Xavier's son
 Marque Richardson as Xavier's oldest son (uncredited)
 Kurt Fuller as Mr. Thompson
 Aki Aleong as Dalai Lama

Production 
The film was initially slated for theatrical release on February 9, 2007, as Superhero! under the direction of David Zucker. However, it was delayed, and the film later began production on September 17, 2007, in New York, and the director's chair was shifted to Craig Mazin, with Zucker being pushed back to being a producer. Though the film was produced in New York, the flyover scenes used as transitions in the film use footage of the business district in downtown Kansas City, Missouri.

Zucker said the film primarily parodied Spider-Man and Batman Begins, but it also spoofed X-Men, Fantastic Four, and Superman. The producer elaborated, "It's a spoof of the whole superhero genre, but this one probably has more of a unified plot, like The Naked Gun had."

Release

Critical response 
Superhero Movie received generally negative reviews from critics. On Rotten Tomatoes the film has an approval rating of 16% based on 51 reviews with an average rating of 3.80/10. The site's critical consensus reads, "Superhero Movie is not the worst of the spoof genre, but relies on tired gags and lame pop culture references all the same." On Metacritic, the film has a score of 33 out of 100 based on 14 critics, indicating "generally unfavorable reviews". Audiences polled by CinemaScore gave the film an average grade of "C+" on an A+ to F scale.

Box office performance 
On its opening weekend, the film grossed $9,510,297 in 2,960 theaters averaging to about $3,212 per venue and ranked No. 3 at the box office. It has grossed $25,881,068 in North America, and $45,285,554 internationally for a total of $71,166,622 in worldwide box office receipts.

DVD release 
Superhero Movie was released on DVD July 8, 2008. It was released in the rated PG-13 theatrical version (75 min.) and the extended edition (81 minutes). The extended DVD features commentary by Zucker, Weiss, and Mazin, deleted scenes, and an alternate ending. There is also a Blockbuster Exclusive version of the Film which is the PG-13 version with the bonus features on the Unrated version and even more deleted scenes.

 Audio commentary by writer/director Craig Mazin and producers David Zucker and Robert K. Weiss — Extended Version Only
 Deleted scenes
 Alternate ending
 Meet the Cast featurette
 The Art of Spoofing featurette
 Theatrical trailer

The European (Region 2) DVD has 15 certificate and has all the features of the Extended Region 1 version.

Music 
Sara Paxton performed the song heard during the credits, titled "I Need A Hero", which she also wrote with Michael Jay and Johnny Pedersen.

Superhero! Song 

Star of the film Drake Bell composed (along with Michael Corcoran) and recorded a song for the movie entitled "Superhero! Song" during the movie's post-production. Co-star Sara Paxton provided backup vocals for the song. This song can be heard in the credits of the movie, however it is credited as being titled "Superbounce". It originally appeared on Bell's Myspace Music page. It was released in iTunes Store as a digital downloadable single on April 8, 2008.

Track listing

Parody targets 
The film parodies the entire superhero genre but is mainly a direct parody of Spider-Man and Batman Begins. However, the film also features some spoofs of the 20th Century Fox X-Men characters, and the Fantastic Four, and some members of both teams are featured in the film.

The film also makes references to other films such as when Rick Riker and Trey are in a bus and Trey is pointing out the different groups of cliques, this parodies the Mean Girls scene where Janis explains to Cady the cliques. One of the cliques is "Frodos" – kids dressed up as Hobbits looking similar to Frodo, The Lord of the Rings character.

The film also makes fun of certain celebrities and their real-life actions such as Tom Cruise's Scientology video and Barry Bonds' alleged use of steroids. It also makes fun of British scientist Stephen Hawking.

See also 
 Spoof film

References

External links 

 
 
 
 
 

2000s action comedy films
2000s parody films
2000s superhero films
2000s teen comedy films
2008 films
American action comedy films
American parody films
American slapstick comedy films
American superhero films
American teen comedy films
Cultural depictions of Nelson Mandela
Cultural depictions of Stephen Hawking
Cultural depictions of the 14th Dalai Lama
Cultural depictions of Tom Cruise
Dimension Films films
Films scored by James L. Venable
Films shot in Los Angeles
Metro-Goldwyn-Mayer films
Parodies of Spider-Man
Parodies of Superman
Parody superheroes
Teen superhero comedy films
2008 comedy films
2000s English-language films
Films produced by Robert K. Weiss
2000s American films
Films with screenplays by Craig Mazin